This is a list of notable professional a cappella groups that have an article in Wikipedia.

A 
 Acappella
 Anonymous 4
 Acappella Vocal Band
 Amarcord
 Ambassadors of Harmony
 ARORA (formerly SONOS)
 Acoustix
 Anthem Lights
 Acapop! KIDS

B 
 Bella Voce
 Berywam
 The Blanks
 The Blenders
 Blue Jupiter
 The Bobs
 Bounding Main
 Brothers in Harmony
 The Buzztones

C 
 Cadence (disbanded in 2020)
 Cantabile - The London Quartet
 Cantus
 Cappella Romana
 Chanticleer
 Chapter 6 (band)
 Chicago a cappella
 Club for Five
 The Coats
 Coco's Lunch
 Committed (vocal group)
 Cosmos (band)

D 
 Danny & The Memories (1963-1967)
 Da Vinci's Notebook  (disbanded in 2004)
 DCappella
 Duwende

E 
 The Essentials (disbanded in 2011)

F 
 FACE
 The Filharmonic
 Five O'Clock Shadow
 The Flying Pickets
 Fool Moon

G 
 Gas House Gang (disbanded in 2005)
 The Gesualdo Six
 GLAD

H 
 The Hilliard Ensemble
 Home Free
 The House Jacks
 The Hyannis Sound

I 
 The Idea of North

J 
 Jud Jud

K 
 The King's Singers
 The Kwartet

L 
 Ladysmith Black Mambazo
 The Longest Johns

M 
 The Maccabeats
 Maybebop
 Maytree
 The Magnets
 The Manhattan Transfer
 Metro Vocal Group
 Metropolitan Male Quartet
 MICappella
 Monkey Puzzle
 Mosaic

N 
 Naturally 7
 Neri per Caso
 Nota
 The Nylons
 New Recording 47

O 
 Octappella
 Out of the Blue
 Overboard

P 
 Pentatonix
 Perpetuum Jazzile
 The Persuasions
 Pieces of 8
 Pikkardiys'ka Tertsia
 Die Prinzen
 The Puppini Sisters

R 
 Rajaton
 The Real Group
 Rescue
 Riltons Vänner
 Rockapella

S
 Seminaarinmäen mieslaulajat (Semmarit)
 Singer Pur
 Die Singphoniker
 Six Appeal
 Six13
 The Soil
 SONO
 Starling Arrow
 Straight No Chaser
 Street Corner Symphony
 Streetnix
 Svetoglas
 Sweet Honey in the Rock
 Sweet Sorrow
 Swingle Singers

T 
 Take 6
 Tonic Sol-fa
 Toxic Audio

U 
 Urban Zakapa

V 
 Van Canto
 Vive
 Voca People
 Vocal Point
 Vocal Sampling
 vocaldente
 Voces8
 Voctave
 Voice Male
 VoicePlay

W 
 Wise Guys
 Witloof Bay

 
a cappella